Peru competed in the Summer Olympic Games for the first time at the 1936 Summer Olympics in Berlin, Germany. 40 competitors, all men, took part in 16 events in 8 sports. Peru's participation in the Olympic Games forced the authorities to suspend the Peruvian football league for 1936.

Football controversy

Austria played Peru in an astonishing game leading to a huge political row.

Time Magazine reported: In Lima President Oscar Benavides of Peru last week addressed an angry crowd: "I have just received cables from Argentina, Chile, Uruguay and Mexico supporting the Peruvian attitude against the crafty Berlin decision." The crowd, which had already torn an Olympic flag, gathered to listen to more speeches at the Plaza San Martin. Later it threw stones to the German Consulate's windows until police arrived in trucks. At Callao, Lima's seaport, workmen on the docks refused to load two German vessels.

The "crafty Berlin decision" concerned a soccer game on the fortnight in which the Peruvians overturned a 2-goal deficit against Austria to take the tie into extra-time and win the match 4-2, with a goal scored in the last minute of extra-time. After the game, Austria argued that Peruvian players had manhandled them, and that spectators, one of them brandishing a revolver, had swarmed down on the field. FIFA ordered the game replayed behind closed doors, so Peru's whole Olympic team of 40 promptly withdrew from the Games in protest; the game was awarded to Austria by default. Said Miguel Dasso of the Peruvian Olympic Committee: "We've no faith in European athletics. We have come here and found a bunch of merchants."

Athletics

Basketball

Roster:

Miguel Godoy, Luis Jacob, Roberto Rospigliosi, Koko Cárdenas, Fernando Ruiz, "Canon" Ore, Jose Carlos Godoy, Armando Rossi, Rolando Bacigalupo, Manuel Fiestas, Willy Dasso, Antuco Flecha (Coach: Pedro Vera)

First Round

Second Round

Third Round

Peru was awarded a bye to the next round.

Fourth Round

Poland won by walkover and was awarded 2 points.

Fifth Place Match

Uruguay won by walkover and was awarded 2 points.

Cycling

Road
Team

Peru finished without a time during the team road race.
Men

Times were not recorded for any of the four competing athletes because they finished after the 16th place.

Track

Sprints

Diving

Men'

Football

First Round

Quarter finals

Due to a pitch invasion, the match was declared null and void, and ordered to be replayed on August 10.  Peru objected to the replay decision and withdrew from the tournament.

Replay

Modern pentathlon

One male pentathlete represented Peru in 1936.

Men

Shooting

Men

Rifle

Swimming

References

External links
Official Olympic Reports

Nations at the 1936 Summer Olympics
1936
1936 in Peruvian sport